A number of vessels of the People's Liberation Army Navy have borne the name Xiangtan, after the city Xiangtan.

 , a Type 053H1 frigate. Transferred to the Bangladesh Navy in 1989  and renamed .
 , a Type 054A frigate, in service since 2016.

References 

People's Liberation Army Navy ship names